The 12th General Assembly of Nova Scotia represented Nova Scotia between 1820 and 1826.

The assembly sat at the pleasure of the Governor of Nova Scotia, James Kempt.

Simon Bradstreet Robie was chosen as speaker for the house. Samuel George William Archibald became speaker after Robie was named to the Council in 1824.

List of members

Notes:

References
Journal and proceedings of the House of Assembly, 1820 (1821)

Terms of the General Assembly of Nova Scotia
1820 in Canada
1821 in Canada
1822 in Canada
1823 in Canada
1824 in Canada
1825 in Canada
1826 in Canada
1820 establishments in Nova Scotia
1826 disestablishments in Nova Scotia